Johannes Rau (16 January 193127 January 2006) was a German politician (SPD). He was the president of Germany from 1 July 1999 until 30 June 2004 and the minister president of North Rhine-Westphalia from 20 September 1978 to 9 June 1998. In the latter role, he also served as president of the Bundesrat in 1982/83 and in 1994/95.

Education and work

Rau was born in the Barmen part of Wuppertal, Rhine Province, as the third of five children. His family was strongly Protestant. As a schoolboy, Rau was active in the Confessing Church, which resisted Nazism.

Rau left school in 1949 and worked as a publisher, especially with the Protestant Youth Publishing House.

Political career
Rau was a member of the All-German People's Party (GVP), which was founded by Gustav Heinemann. The party was known for proposing German reunification from 1952 until it was disbanded in 1957.

In 1958, the pacifist Rau and his political mentor, Gustav Heinemann, joined the Social Democratic Party of Germany (SPD), where he was active in the Wuppertal chapter. He served as deputy chairman of the SPD party of Wuppertal and was elected later on to the City Council (1964–1978), where he served as chairman of the SPD Group (1964–1967) and later as Mayor (1969–1970).

In 1958, Rau was elected for the first time as member of the Landtag (state parliament) of North Rhine-Westphalia. In 1967, he became chairman of the SPD fraction in the Landtag, and in 1970, he was Minister of Science and Education in the cabinet of Minister President Heinz Kühn. He soon gained a reputation as a reformer. As part of the mass education campaign of the 1970s, he founded five universities, each at different sites, in North Rhine-Westphalia and initiated Germany's first distance learning university at Hagen (modelled on the British Open University).

In 1977, Rau became Chairman of the North Rhine-Westphalia SPD and, in 1978, Minister President of the state, which he remained until 1998, with four successful elections for the SPD, which became strongest party in the Landtag each time and gained an absolute majority three times, in 1980, 1985, 1990 and finally 1995. From 1995 onwards, Rau led an SPD-Greens coalition in North Rhine-Westphalia. Rau twice served as President of the Bundesrat in 1982/83 and 1994/95.

In 1987, Rau was his party's candidate to become chancellor of Germany for the SPD, but he lost the elections against Helmut Kohl’s Christian Democrats (CDU). In 1994, Rau was a candidate to become President of Germany but lost to Roman Herzog.

In 1998, Rau stepped down from his positions as SPD chairman and Minister President, and on 23 May 1999, he was elected President of Germany by the Federal Assembly of Germany to succeed Roman Herzog (CDU). On 1 July 2004, he was succeeded by Horst Köhler. In common with all other Federal presidents Rau was honored by a Großer Zapfenstreich. At his request the hymn "Jesus bleibet meine Freude" (literally "that Jesus remain my Joy", but commonly Jesu, Joy of Man's Desiring) was included.

During 2000, Rau became the first German head of state to address the Knesset, the Israeli parliament, in German. The controversial step prompted some Israeli delegates to walk out. However, Israeli President Moshe Katsav supported and praised him for bridging the gap between the two states. Rau had a deep and lifelong commitment to bringing reconciliation between Germany and its past.

Death

Rau had a long history of heart disease and died 11 days after his 75th birthday on 27 January 2006. The funeral took place on 7 February following a funeral act of state on the Dorotheenstadt cemetery in Berlin in the closest of family and friends.

Motto and maxim
The maxim of Rau was "to reconcile, not divide".

As his personal motto, Rau adopted the Confessing Church dictum "teneo, quia teneor" (I hold because I am held).

In his acceptance speech after his election, Rau claimed "I never want to be a nationalist but rather a patriot. A patriot is someone who loves his fatherland. A nationalist is someone who condems the fatherland of others." The quote can be attributed to the French writer Romain Gary.

Prizes and medals
Rau was awarded 15 honorary doctorates. 
In 2001, he received the Leo Baeck Medal for his humanitarian work promoting tolerance and social justice.

Private life
He held lay positions in and was a member of the Synod of the Evangelical Church in the Rhineland, a member church of the Evangelical Church in Germany.

On 9 August 1982, Rau married the political scientist Christina Delius (born 1956). Christina Rau is a granddaughter of her husband's mentor, Gustav Heinemann, former President of Germany. The couple had three children: Anna Christina, born 1983, Philip Immanuel, born 1985 and Laura Helene, born 1986.

On 18 August 2004, Rau had to undergo serious heart surgery, in which an artificial heart valve was inserted. Only two months later (19 October 2004), a hematoma in the abdominal cavity was surgically removed.

After leaving office, Rau lived with his family in the federal capital, Berlin. However, they also kept a house in Wuppertal.

Honours 
 : Grand Cross Special Class of the Order of Merit of the Federal Republic of Germany

Foreign honours 
 : Grand Star of the Decoration of Honour for Services to the Republic of Austria (2004)
 : Collar of the Order of the White Lion
 : Knight of the Order of the Elephant (2002)
 : Collar of the Order of the Cross of Terra Mariana
 : Knight Grand Cross with Collar Order of Merit of the Italian Republic 
 : Grand Cross with Collar of the Order of the Falcon (2003) 
 : 2nd Class, then, 1st Class with Chain of the Order of the Three Stars
 : Honorary Companions of Honour with Collar of the National Order of Merit
 : Grand Cross of the Order of St. Olav
 : Knight of the Order of the White Eagle
 : Grand Cross (or 1st Class) of the Order of the White Double Cross (2001)
 : Collar of the Order of Isabella the Catholic (2002)
 : Knight of the Royal Order of the Seraphim
 : First Class of the Order of the State of Republic of Turkey (2000)
 : Collar of the Order of Pope Pius IX
 Olympic Order (2004)
 Leo Baeck Medal (1996)

See also
 Politics of Germany

References

External links

  www.bundespraesident.de: Johannes Rau—Official biography
  online book of condolence for Johannes Rau

 
 

 
 

 
 

 
 

 
 

 
1931 births
2006 deaths
20th-century presidents of Germany
21st-century presidents of Germany
All-German People's Party politicians
Presidents of the German Bundesrat
Members of the Landtag of North Rhine-Westphalia
German Lutherans
Lutheran pacifists
German Christian socialists
People from the Rhine Province
Politicians from Wuppertal
Presidents of Germany
Social Democratic Party of Germany politicians

Collars of the Order of the White Lion
Recipients of the Collar of the Order of the Cross of Terra Mariana
Recipients of the Grand Star of the Decoration for Services to the Republic of Austria
Recipients of the Olympic Order
Collars of the Order of Isabella the Catholic
Lutheran socialists
Ministers-President of North Rhine-Westphalia
Grand Crosses Special Class of the Order of Merit of the Federal Republic of Germany
Burials at the Dorotheenstadt Cemetery
Recipients of the Order of the White Eagle (Poland)